"Diary Queen" is the 12th episode of the thirty-second season of the American animated television series The Simpsons, and the 696th episode overall. The episode was directed by Matthew Nastuk, and written by Jeff Westbrook. The episode follows Bart’s discovery of his former teacher's diary.

Plot
At his yard sale, Ned Flanders becomes angry when people who buy his things are not respectful of them. Bart and Milhouse buy several books as part of a scheme to record a stunt. When that backfires, the boys discover Edna Krabappel's old diary among the books. They then escape Fat Tony and his mob and prank the school staff.

Despite Milhouse repeatedly urging him not to invade Edna's privacy, Bart heads to his treehouse and starts reading the diary, discovering a page where Edna had written that she thought Bart had potential in succeeding in school. Convinced that he is the most improved student, Bart helps around in school and gets an "A" on his test. At dinner, the family celebrate with a cake, but Marge and Lisa look around his room, suspecting him of cheating. With the help of Maggie, Lisa finds the diary at the treehouse and discovers that Edna was actually referring to her pet cat. Lisa hides this from Bart, which soon stresses her out. When Bart decides to enter the school spelling bee, Lisa reveals the truth, causing a depressed Bart to hide in the treehouse alone.

Later in the treehouse, Ned reveals to Bart that his family had considered leaving Springfield, but were stopped by Edna, who believed she needed to stay, as children like Bart needed her. Realizing that Edna truly did care for him, Bart returns the diary to Ned. At home, Ned reads the diary and is brought to tears over an entry where Edna says that being married to him made her dreams come true.

The episode ends with a montage of Edna's moments throughout the series.

Production

Casting
The late Marcia Wallace guest-stars as Edna Krabappel through archive recordings (specifically, from the episodes "Bart Gets a 'Z'" and "The Seemingly Never-Ending Story") in the episode and Joe Mantegna appears as Fat Tony. This is the final episode in which actor Harry Shearer voices the black character of Dr. Hibbert. Beginning with the following episode "Wad Goals", he is voiced by Kevin Michael Richardson who is African-American. In addition, Julio had his voice provided by Mario Jose in this episode.

Release
The episode was scheduled to debut on January 10, 2021, but was rescheduled to February 14 due to being preempted by the NFL playoffs; rain delays at the 2021 Daytona 500 further delayed all prime time shows scheduled for broadcast on February 21. On February 14, the episode was published on Amazon and iTunes but it was later removed. Even though the episode aired a week later on February 21, the episode is still unavailable on iTunes, but is available on Amazon.

Reception

Viewing figures 
In the United States, the episode was watched live by 1.43 million viewers.

Critical response 
Tony Sokol with Den of Geek, said "This is a different kind of arc for The Simpsons. “Diary Queen' is on an uplifting trajectory until Lisa knocks it off course, and ends in a sudden life-affirming crash. Bart’s final warning to Marge, 'I’ll go over the edge if you try to make me feel better,' is wonderfully skewered, but the final twist is a dose of treacle. The episode was originally slated to premiere on Valentine’s Day, and is a sweet sendoff."  He also gave the episode four out of five stars.

References

2021 American television episodes
The Simpsons (season 32) episodes